Mochammad Diky Indriyana (born 4 June 1997) is an Indonesian professional footballer who plays as a goalkeeper for Liga 1 club Persikabo 1973.

Club career

Bali United
Bali United is Indriyana's first professional club. He was recruited in 2015 by then-coach Indra Sjafri along with his teammates Yabes Roni, Martinus Novianto, and Ricky Fajrin.

Celebest (loan)
He was signed for Celebest to play in the Liga 2 in the 2017 season, on loan from Bali United.

Borneo
In 2020, Indriyana signed a one-year contract with Indonesian Liga 1 club Borneo. This season was suspended on 27 March 2020 due to the COVID-19 pandemic. The season was abandoned and was declared void on 20 January 2021.

Persikabo 1973
He was signed for Persikabo 1973 to play in Liga 1 in the 2021 season. Indriyana made his league debut on 3 December 2021 against Persija Jakarta at the Sultan Agung Stadium, Bantul.

International career
Indriyana made his senior international debut on 21 March 2017, against Myanmar.

Career statistics

Club

International

Honours

Club
Bali United
 Liga 1: 2019

References

External links
 
 

1997 births
Living people
Indonesian footballers
People from Ciamis
Sportspeople from West Java
Indonesia youth international footballers
Indonesia international footballers
Association football goalkeepers
Liga 1 (Indonesia) players
Liga 2 (Indonesia) players
Bali United F.C. players
Borneo F.C. players
Persikabo 1973 players